Agrotis arenarius is a moth of the family Noctuidae. It is endemic to Sable Island, Nova Scotia.

External links
Image
Only on Sable?

Agrotis
Moths of North America
Endemic fauna of Canada
Endemic fauna of Nova Scotia
Moths described in 1983